The black-banded woodcreeper (Dendrocolaptes picumnus) is a species of bird in the Dendrocolaptinae subfamily, the woodcreepers. It is discontinuously spread from Chiapas to Paraguay and northern Argentina. Its natural habitats are subtropical or tropical moist lowland forests and subtropical or tropical moist montane forests.

References

Further reading

External links
Black-banded woodcreeper videos on the Internet Bird Collection
Black-banded woodcreeper photo gallery VIREO Photo-High Res
Photo; Article chandra.as.utexas.edu

black-banded woodcreeper
Birds of Guatemala
Birds of Honduras
Birds of Costa Rica
Birds of the Amazon Basin
Birds of the Guianas
Birds of Colombia
Birds of Venezuela
Birds of Ecuador
Birds of Bolivia
Birds of Paraguay
black-banded woodcreeper
Taxonomy articles created by Polbot